Charles Lyman Haynes (1870–1947) was an American architect who designed a large number of buildings in Seattle during the early 20th century, including the Roy Vue. Born in Santa Cruz, California, Haynes arrived in Seattle in 1907.

References

1870 births
1947 deaths
20th-century American architects
People from Santa Cruz County, California